Roland Tüske (born 12 September 1977 in Budapest) is a Hungarian professional footballer who plays for Budaörsi SC.

Career 

Tüske began his career with Vasas SC before moving to FC Tatabánya in 1997. He then signed for FC Sopron in November 2000, before moving to Szombathelyi Haladás in 2001. He signed for Brazilian side Atlético Paranaense in February 2003, but left the club in May 2003 without making a first-team appearance. He later played for Lombard-Pápa TFC between 2004 and 2005, and for Budaörsi SC during the 2007–08 season.

References

External links 
 

1977 births
Footballers from Budapest
Living people
Hungarian footballers
Vasas SC players
FC Tatabánya players
FC Sopron players
Club Athletico Paranaense players
Szombathelyi Haladás footballers
Lombard-Pápa TFC footballers

Association football forwards